The 1933 season was Wisła Krakóws 25th year as a club.

Friendlies

Ekstraklasa

Western Group

Championship round

Squad, appearances and goals

|}

Goalscorers

Disciplinary record

External links
1933 Wisła Kraków season at historiawisly.pl

Wisła Kraków seasons
Association football clubs 1933 season
Wisla